The Polynomial: Space of the Music is an indie 3D shooter music video game by Russian developer Dmytry Lavrov, released on May 28, 2009.

References

External links

2009 video games
Indie video games
Music video games
Shooter video games
Video games developed in Russia
Video games using procedural generation